Dilip D'Souza (born 1960) is a Mumbai-based writer and journalist. He writes about social and political causes. His columns have appeared in The Sunday Observer, Rediff.com, Outlook, Mid-Day, Hindustan Times, indiatogether.org, The Caravan and other publications.

Personal life
Dilip D'Souza was born to Neela, a former Indian Administrative Service officer and Maharashtra Chief Secretary and activist J.B. D'Souza. D'Souza did a BE in Electrical and Electronics Engineering from BITS Pilani (1976–81) and an MS in Computer Science from Brown University (1984).

He married French language teacher Vibha Kamat in 1993, and they have two children, son Sahir, born 1999 and daughter Surabhi, born 2004. He studied and worked as a software engineer in United States from 1981 to 1992 when he returned to India to write full-time. He speaks Tamil, Hindi, Marathi, Konkani, English, French and Spanish.

As an alumnus of Birla Institute of Technology and Science, he is dedicated to alumni activities and has come over many times to his alma mater. He was there in February 2010 to promote his new book Roadrunner. He is currently on the editorial board of the BITS Alumni magazine Sandpaper. D'Souza also maintains a blog "Death Ends Fun".

Awards
D'Souza has won several awards for his writing, including The Daily Beast award for South Asian commentary, the Statesman Rural Reporting Award, the Times of India/Red Cross prize, the Outlook/Picador nonfiction prize (for which he was also, earlier, runner up), the Sanctuary Magazine prize and more.

 Outlook/Picador prize in 2004 for his essay "Ride Across The River". It was about an Army officer killed in action in Kashmir, examining patriotism through his example.

Affiliations
 D'Souza is a member of the Managing Committee of Citizens for Peace (CfP) in Mumbai.
 D'Souza has worked with the People's Union for Civil Liberties (PUCL), the Narmada Bachao Andolan and Ekta.
 D'Souza was a member of the Pakistan-India People's Forum for Peace and Democracy (PIPFPD). The PIPFPD pursues "Track II diplomacy", meaning increased contact between ordinary people in both countries, towards peace between India and Pakistan.
 He was also a member of the India Progressive Action Group (IPAG) in Austin, Texas, that funded and worked closely with various rural development projects in India.
 He was on the editorial board of the Consumer Guidance Society of India (CGSI) and the Foundation for Humanization.
 D'Souza was an invited speaker/panelist to the Austin conference of the Association for India's Development (AID) and witnessed first-hand their relief and rehabilitation work in Tamil Nadu after the tsunami in December 2004.

Works
 Branded by Law: Looking at India's Denotified Tribes, by Dilip D'Souza. Published by Penguin Books, 2001. .
 The Narmada Dammed: An Inquiry into the Politics of Development, by Dilip D'Souza. Published by Penguin Books, 2002.  
 Roadrunner: An Indian Quest in America, by Dilip D'Souza. Published by HarperCollins India, 2009. 
 The Curious Case of Binayak Sen, by Dilip D'Souza. Published by HarperCollins India, 2012. 
 Final Test: Exit Sachin Tendulkar, by Dilip D'Souza. Published by Random House, 2014. 
 Dhyan Singh 'Chand': Hockey's Magician, by Dilip D'Souza. Published by Pratham Books, 2016.

References

External links
 Dilip D'Souza columns at Rediff.com
 Dilip D'Souza's blog

1960 births
Living people
Indian male journalists
Indian travel writers
Indian political writers
Activists from Maharashtra
Indian columnists
Indian bloggers
Writers from Mumbai
Birla Institute of Technology and Science, Pilani alumni
Brown University alumni
Indian political journalists
Male bloggers